Placide Frans Tempels, OFM (18 February 1906 – 9 October 1977) was a Belgian Franciscan missionary in the Congo who became famous for his book Bantu Philosophy.

Life
Tempels was born in Berlaar, Belgium.  Born Frans Tempels, he took the name "Placide" on his entry into a Franciscan seminary in 1924.  After his ordination to the priesthood in 1930 he taught for a short time in Belgium before being posted to the Belgian Congo (now the Democratic Republic of the Congo) in 1933.  He stayed there for twenty-nine years, broken by only two short stays back in Belgium.  In April 1962 he returned to live in a Franciscan monastery in Hasselt, where he died in 1977.

Bantu Philosophy

Though neither African nor a philosopher, Tempels had a huge influence on African philosophy through the publication in 1945 of his book La philosophie bantoue (published in English translation in 1959) as Bantu Philosophy).

External links
Placide Tempels — Website in French (with option of English navigation); includes the full text of Bantu Philosophy, plus on-line critical readings

1906 births
1977 deaths
Belgian writers in French
Belgian Roman Catholic missionaries
Belgian Franciscans
Christian missionaries in the Democratic Republic of the Congo
People from Berlaar
Philosophy writers